Wachwa Runtuna (Quechua wachwa Andean goose, runtu egg, -na a suffix, "where the Andean goose lays eggs", also spelled Huachhua Runtuna) is a mountain in the Cordillera Central in the Andes of Peru which reaches a height of approximately . It is located in the Lima Region, Yauyos Province, on the border of the districts of Alis and Tomas, south of Tomas.

References 

Mountains of Peru
Mountains of Lima Region